Melanomys caliginosus, also known as the dusky melanomys or dusky rice rat, is a species of rodent in the genus Melanomys of family Cricetidae. It is found from Central America, in Honduras, Nicaragua, Costa Rica, and Panama, into South America, where it occurs in Venezuela, Colombia, and Ecuador. Populations currently classified under M. caliginosus may in fact include more than one species.

References

Literature cited
Anderson, R.P., Gómez-Laverde, M. and Timm, R. 2008. . In IUCN. IUCN Red List of Threatened Species. Version 2009.2. <www.iucnredlist.org>. Downloaded on November 15, 2009.
Musser, G.G. and Carleton, M.D. 2005. Superfamily Muroidea. Pp. 894–1531 in Wilson, D.E. and Reeder, D.M. (eds.). Mammal Species of the World: a taxonomic and geographic reference. 3rd ed. Baltimore: The Johns Hopkins University Press, 2 vols., 2142 pp. 

Melanomys
Mammals of Colombia
Rodents of Central America
Taxa named by Robert Fisher Tomes
Mammals described in 1860
Taxonomy articles created by Polbot